The Yenyuan stream salamander (Batrachuperus yenyuanensis) is a species of salamander in the family Hynobiidae endemic to Sichuan, China, where it occurs in Yanyuan, Xichang, Mianning, and Puxiong counties.
Its natural habitats are rivers, freshwater lakes, and freshwater marshes. It is a high-altitude salamander, typically inhabiting the waterways along the eastern edge of the Qinghai-Tibetan Plateau at altitudes 2440 to 4025 meters above sea level. Adults eat a diet consisting mainly of insects and shrimp, and to a lesser degree, algae and seeds. It is threatened by habitat loss.

References 

Batrachuperus
Taxonomy articles created by Polbot
Amphibians described in 1950